Grand Etang Lake is a crater lake in an extinct volcano (responsible for the formation of the Island Grenada) which hasn't erupted in 12,000 years. It is located on the island of Grenada, in Saint Andrew Parish. The lake is approximately 20 feet deep and 36 acres in area  and is also rumored to be home to a mermaid living in the depths that lure men to their watery grave.

One is able to discover distinct eco-zones because of the park's varied elevation. Guided tours are available. A self-guided hike around the azure colored lake along a trail goes past waterfalls and through jungle. Tropical birds, tiny bright-chartreuse lizards, a variety of orchids, and armadillos can be seen. Mount Qua Qua can be seen across the lake. Trail hikes range from 15 minutes to 4 hours. Mona monkeys can also be seen overhead in the forest.

Grand Etang Lake is represented on the base of the Coat of arms of Grenada.

References

External links 

http://farm4.static.flickr.com/3162/2747233437_1e301f2143.jpg

Extinct volcanoes
Lakes of Grenada
Subduction volcanoes
Volcanic crater lakes
Volcanoes of Grenada